Ricardo Rodríguez Jiménez (born 16 January 1975) is a Mexican politician formerly from the National Action Party. From 2006 to 2009 he served as Deputy of the LX Legislature of the Mexican Congress representing Jalisco.

References

1975 births
Living people
Politicians from Jalisco
National Action Party (Mexico) politicians
21st-century Mexican politicians
Deputies of the LX Legislature of Mexico
Members of the Chamber of Deputies (Mexico) for Jalisco